Pasvalys is a town in Panevėžys County, Lithuania, located near the bank of the Svalia River.

History
In 1557, the Treaty of Pasvalys was signed in the town, which provoked Ivan IV of Russia to start the Livonian War. Pasvalys has mineral spring waters – in 1923 physician K. Armonas created a small sanatorium. At this time about 200 people spent time in sanatorium yearly.

Soviet occupation and mass deportations in 1941 were devastating – most of the most active teachers and civil servants, intellectuals were deported to remote regions in Russia and Central Asia.

In August 1941, 1349 Jews from the village and the surroundings were executed by an Einsatzgruppen of Germans and local collaborators as mentioned in the Jäger Report.

After 1944 Soviet mass deportations started again – the main target were farmers and their families. Hundreds of families were deported. The program of forced collectivisation has started.

Since 1947 partisans of Pasvalys district fought against Soviet occupants. Pasvalys' partisans belonged to Algimantas military district (apygarda), later - to Vytis military district of the Lithuanian partisans. Most of the partisans operated in Žalioji rinktinė (The Green Squad), which was based in Žalioji giria (The Green Forest).

Education
Pasvalys Gimnasium of Petras Vileisis.

Industry

Pasvalys is famous for its farmhouse beer and is a part of Beer Route in Lithuania.

Cheese factory owned by company Pieno Žvaigždės is located in the city.

Sports

Pasvalys has its basketball club - BC Pieno žvaigždės.

Gallery

Twin towns and Sister cities
Pasvalys is twinned with:
 Żory in Poland

References

Official Homepage
Pasvalys district municipality

 
Cities in Lithuania
Cities in Panevėžys County
Municipalities administrative centres of Lithuania
1497 establishments in Europe
15th-century establishments in Lithuania
Trakai Voivodeship
Ponevezhsky Uyezd
Holocaust locations in Lithuania
Pasvalys District Municipality